Moorook may refer to.

Moorook, South Australia, a town and locality
Moorook Game Reserve, a protected area in South Australia
Moorook Island - refer List of islands within the Murray River in South Australia
Moorook railway line, a former railway line in South Australia
Hundred of Moorook, a cadastral unit in South Australia

See also
Moorook West Wood Camp